Ashraf Ashirov is an Azerbaijani freestyle wrestler competing in the 79 kg division.

Career 
In 2021, he won the silver medal in the men's 79 kg event at the 2021 World Junior Wrestling Championships held in Ufa, Russia.

In 2022, he won one of the bronze medals in the men's 79 kg event at the 2022 European U23 Wrestling Championship held in Plovdiv, Bulgaria. He won the silver medal in the 79 kg event at the 2022 European Wrestling Championships held in Budapest, Hungary. He competed in the 79kg event at the 2022 World Wrestling Championships held in Belgrade, Serbia.

Achievements

References

External links 
 

2001 births
Living people
Azerbaijani male sport wrestlers
European Wrestling Championships medalists